Goldie "Red" Davis was an American baseball pitcher in the Negro leagues. He played from 1924 to 1926, spending short stints with the Indianapolis ABCs, Cleveland Elites, and Dayton Marcos.

References

External links
 and Seamheads

Indianapolis ABCs players
Dayton Marcos players
Cleveland Elites players
Year of birth missing
Year of death missing
Baseball pitchers